The 1998–99 National Soccer League season, known under a sponsorship arrangement as the 1998–99 Ericsson Cup, was the 23rd season of the National Soccer League in Australia.

Overview
It was contested by 15 teams, and South Melbourne won the championship. Northern Spirit FC entered the competition.

Regular season

League table

Finals series

Bracket

Elimination finals
Northern Spirit 0-0 : 1-2 Marconi Stallions
Adelaide City 0-0 : 1-2 Perth Glory

Major semi-final
South Melbourne 2-1 : 0-0 Sydney United

Minor semi-final
Perth Glory 1-0 Marconi Stallions

Preliminary final
Sydney United 2-1 Perth Glory

Grand Final

Footnotes

References
Australia - List of final tables (RSSSF)

National Soccer League (Australia) seasons
1998 in Australian soccer
1999 in Australian soccer
Aus
Aus